Ronnie Bunting (10 January 1948 – 15 October 1980) was a Protestant Irish republican and socialist activist in Ireland. He became a member of the Official IRA in the early 1970s and was a founder-member of the Irish National Liberation Army (INLA) in 1974. He became leader of the INLA in 1978 and was assassinated in 1980 aged 32.

Background
Bunting came from an Ulster Protestant family in East Belfast. His father, Ronald Bunting, had been a major in the British Army and Ronnie grew up in various military barracks around the world. Ronnie's father became a supporter and associate of Ian Paisley and ran for election under the Protestant Unionist Party banner. Journalist Walter Ellis, who was Bunting's cousin and also a Protestant left-wing advocate of a united Ireland, recalled him in their teenage years as domineering with violent tendencies. Ellis was expelled from Orangefield High School after setting fire to the prefects' room at Bunting's urging.

Having completed his education and graduating from Queen's University Belfast, Ronnie Bunting briefly became a history teacher in Belfast, but later become involved in the Northern Ireland Civil Rights Association and then with Irish republican organisations.

Unlike most Protestants in Northern Ireland, Bunting became a militant republican. His father, by contrast, was a committed Ulster loyalist, who organised armed stewards for counter-demonstrations (against civil rights marches) called by Ian Paisley, most infamously at the Burntollet Bridge incident, when his followers attacked a People's Democracy civil rights march on 4 January 1969. Despite their political differences, Ronnie remained close with his father.

Membership of the Official IRA
Some time around 1970, as a result of his left wing, secular interpretation of Irish republicanism, as well as a belief in the necessity of armed revolution,  Bunting joined the Official Irish Republican Army (OIRA). (The other wing of the IRA—the Provisional Irish Republican Army—was more nationalist and Catholic in its outlook.) At the time, the communal conflict known as the Troubles was beginning and the Official IRA was involved in shootings and bombings. Along with many others, Bunting was interned in November 1971, and held in Long Kesh until the following April (see also Operation Demetrius).

Membership of the INLA
In 1974, Bunting followed Seamus Costello and other militants who disagreed with the OIRA's ceasefire of 1972, into a new grouping, the Irish National Liberation Army (INLA). Immediately, a violent feud broke out between the OIRA and the INLA.

In 1975, Bunting survived an assassination attempt when he was shot in a Belfast street. In 1977, Costello was killed by an OIRA gunman in Dublin. Bunting and his family hid in Wales until 1978, when he returned to Belfast. For the remaining two years of his life, Bunting was the military leader of the INLA. The grouping regularly attacked the British Army and Royal Ulster Constabulary (RUC) in Belfast. Bunting called in claims of responsibility to the media by the code name "Captain Green".

Assassination

At about 4:30 a.m. on 15 October 1980, several gunmen wearing balaclavas stormed Bunting's home in the Downfine Gardens area of Andersonstown. They shot Bunting, his wife Suzanne and another INLA man and ex-member of the Red Republican Party, Noel Lyttle, who had been staying there after his recent release from detention. According to The Guardian report by David Beresford,

The shots woke the Buntings' children, age 7 and 3, who ran screaming into the street after discovering their parents lying together at the top of the stairs, covered in blood. Mr Lyttle was shot in bed, near a cot in which the Buntings' baby son was sleeping. 

Both Ronnie Bunting and Lyttle were killed. Suzanne Bunting, who was shot in the face,  survived her serious injuries.  The attack was claimed by the Ulster Defence Association (UDA), but the INLA claimed the Special Air Service were involved.

Upon his death, Bunting's body was kept in a funeral parlour on the Newtownards Road opposite the headquarters of the UDA. On the day of the funeral, as the coffin was being removed, UDA members jeered from their building. The IRSP had wanted a republican paramilitary-style funeral for Bunting but his father refused and had Bunting buried in the family plot of a Church of Ireland cemetery near Donaghadee.

References

1940s births
1980 deaths
Deaths by firearm in Northern Ireland
Irish National Liberation Army members
Irish republicans
Irish republicans interned without trial
Official Irish Republican Army members
People killed by the Ulster Defence Association
Protestant Irish nationalists